Ellis Bay Wildlife Management Area is a Wildlife Management Area in Wicomico County, Maryland. The area borders Chesapeake Bay and is mainly wetland, both open and forested.

References

External links
 Ellis Bay Wildlife Management Area

Wildlife management areas of Maryland
Protected areas of Wicomico County, Maryland
IUCN Category V